Akuai-deng is a  boma in  Jalle payam, Bor North County, Jonglei State, South Sudan, about 45 kilometers northeast of Bor.
The village borders  Baidit Payam and is located at the southern extent of the sudd, South Sudan's central wetlands, near to the east bank of the  Bahr al Jabal River.

Demographics
According to the Fifth Population and Housing Census of Sudan, conducted in April 2008, Akuai-deng  boma had a population of 5,248 people, composed of 2,694 male and 2,554 female residents.

Notes

References 

Populated places in Jonglei State